Haplochromis nyererei is a species of cichlid endemic to Lake Victoria in Africa.  This species can reach a length of  SL. The specific name honours Julius Nyerere (1922-1999) who was  President of Tanzania from 1961–1985.

The females of Haplochromis specie prefer male Haplochromis nyererei that are more colorful and brighter compared to the dull male Haplochromis.

References

nyererei
nyererei
Julius Nyerere
Fish described in 1985
Fish of Lake Victoria
Taxonomy articles created by Polbot